Cermei is a commune in Arad County, Romania, situated in the Teuz Plateau, in the basin of the river Sartiș. It is composed of three villages: Avram Iancu (Püspökpuszta), Cermei (situated at 67 km from Arad) and Șomoșcheș (Somoskeszi).

Population
According to the last census, the population of the commune counts 2856 inhabitants, out of which 87.5% are Romanians, 6.9% Hungarians, 4.6% Roms, 0.5% Germans and 0.5% are of other or undeclared nationalities.

History
The first documentary record of the locality Cermei dates back to 1429. Avram Iancu was mentioned in documents in 1828, while Șomoșcheș in 1332.

Economy
The economy of the commune is mainly agricultural, both component sectors are well-developed.

References

Communes in Arad County
Localities in Crișana